Wei Renjie (born 18 February 1991) is a Chinese footballer who currently plays for China League One side Shaanxi Chang'an Athletic.

Club career
Wei Renjie would start his professional career with top tier club Qingdao Jonoon where he made his debut in a league game on 14 June 2009 against Shenzhen F.C. where he came on as a substitute in a 2-2 draw. As a peripheral young player he was loaned out to lower league club Shandong Tengding and then Nanjing Qianbao before making the move permanent as they moved city and renamed themselves Chengdu Qbao. By the 2017 league season he would join third tier club Shaanxi Chang'an Athletic where he gained promotion with them as the club finished third within the 2018 league season while Yanbian Funde was dissolved due to owing taxes.

Career statistics

Notes

References

External links

1991 births
Living people
Chinese footballers
Association football midfielders
Chinese Super League players
China League One players
China League Two players
Qingdao Hainiu F.C. (1990) players
Chengdu Better City F.C. players
Shaanxi Chang'an Athletic F.C. players